The Nordic Institute for Theoretical Physics, or NORDITA, or Nordita, is an international organisation for research in theoretical physics. It was established as Nordisk Institut for Teoretisk Atomfysik in 1957 by Niels Bohr and the Swedish physicist Torsten Gustafson. Nordita was originally located at the Niels Bohr Institute in Copenhagen (Denmark), but moved to the AlbaNova University Centre in Stockholm (Sweden) on 1 January 2007. The main research areas at Nordita are astrophysics, hard and soft condensed matter physics, and high-energy physics.

Research 
 
Since Nordita's establishment in 1957 the original focus on research in atomic and nuclear physics has been broadened. 
Research carried out by Nordita's academic staff presently includes astrophysics, biological physics, hard condensed matter physics and materials physics, soft condensed matter physics, cosmology, statistical physics and complex systems, high-energy physics, and gravitational physics and cosmology. The in-house research forms the backbone of Nordita activities and complements the more service oriented functions. By mission, Nordita has the task of facilitating interactions between physicists in the Nordic countries as well as with the international community; therefore the comparably small institute has a large number of visitors, conferences and scientific programs that last several weeks.

Notable former or present researchers at Nordita include Alexander V. Balatsky, Holger Bech Nielsen, Axel Brandenburg, Gerald E. Brown, Paolo Di Vecchia, James Hamilton, John Hertz, Sabine Hossenfelder, Alan Luther, Ben Roy Mottelson, Christopher J. Pethick, Leon Rosenfeld, Kim Sneppen, John Wettlaufer, and Konstantin Zarembo.

Organization 

 Nordita is governed by a board consisting of one representative and one alternate member from each Nordic country, headed by a chair person. The board appoints a number of research committees which evaluate proposals and advice the board on scientific and educational matters.

The Nordita board nominates a director who is appointed by the president of KTH Royal Institute of Technology and the vice-chancellor of Stockholm University. The director, currently Niels Obers, is responsible for the day-to-day administration of the institute and provides scientific leadership.

Funding 

Nordita is funded jointly by the Nordic countries via the Nordic Council of Ministers, the Swedish Research Council, and the host universities KTH Royal Institute of Technology, Stockholm University and Uppsala University.

References

External links 
Nordita homepage
Nordita Information Brochure 2012

Theoretical physics
Physics institutes
Research institutes in Sweden
International research institutes
Theoretical physics institutes